Cheryl Kathleen Cosim-Alvarez (born February 7, 1974) is a Filipina journalist, news anchor and TV host. She began her career as a journalist at ABS-CBN News and Current Affairs, hosting the programs Magandang Umaga, Pilipinas, Salamat Dok, the hourly news updates, and a radio show on DZMM. After 14 years at ABS-CBN, she joined News5, the news department of TV5 as an on-air talent in summer 2010. Cosim became the co-anchor on Aksyon with Erwin Tulfo. In 2014, she became the news anchor on the late-night newscast Aksyon Tonite.

In 2016, Cosim joined Aksyon sa Umaga together with Mel Sta. Maria, replacing Martin Andanar and Erwin Tulfo.

Cosim was one of the hosts in a segment called "Good Morning Girls" on Good Morning Club, and solo host in Numero, a show about statistics or surveys that related to the people that have stories in behind the numbers.

Cosim currently heads the network's afternoon newscast One Balita Pilipinas, and the primetime newscast Frontline Pilipinas (which also airs on One PH), alongside Raffy Tulfo (now Julius Babao).

Personal life
She is married to John Francis Alvarez, a businessman who used to reside in the United States.

Filmography

Television

Radio

Awards
 Gawad Tanglaw
 2014 - Best Female News Program Anchor

 KBP Golden Dove (Kapisanan ng mga Brodkaster ng Pilipinas)
 2013 - Best Female Newscaster

 Inding-Indie Short Film Festival
 2015 - Most Outstanding Broadcaster Asian Media Award
 2016 - Best News Anchor

References

1974 births
Living people
People from Pangasinan
People from Malolos
Filipino radio journalists
Filipino television news anchors
ABS-CBN personalities
ABS-CBN News and Current Affairs people
TV5 (Philippine TV network) personalities
News5 people